Cohen's Luck is a 1915 American silent comedy film directed by John H. Collins and starring William Wadsworth, Lillian Devere and Viola Dana.

Plot

Cast
 William Wadsworth as Abe Cohen
 Lillian Devere as Cohen's Wife
 Viola Dana as Minnie Cohen
 Harry Scherr as Abe Cohen Jr.
 Duncan McRae as Sam Blumenthal
 Johnnie Walker as David Moss 
 Jessie Stevens as Mrs. Kitty McGee
 Edward Lawrence as Timothy Murphy
 Frank A. Lyons as Steve O'Rourke 
 Henry Leone as Laskey

References

Bibliography
 Langman, Larry. American Film Cycles: The Silent Era. Greenwood Publishing, 1998.

External links
 

1915 films
1915 comedy films
1910s English-language films
American silent feature films
Silent American comedy films
American black-and-white films
Films directed by John H. Collins
Edison Studios films
1910s American films